Vladimir Aleksandrovich Grachev (born 3 March 1942 in Taimanikha, Rodnikovsky District, Ivanovo Region) is a Soviet/Russian scientist, politician, ecologist. Doctor of Technical Sciences, professor, corresponding member of the  Russian Academy of Sciences. Member of the Supreme Soviet of the RSFSR, the State Duma of the third and fourth convocations (1999-2007). Chairman of the Public Council under the Federal Service for Ecological, Technological and Atomic Supervision, member of the Public Council of the State Corporation "Rosatom", Advisory Council under the Chairman of the Accounts Chamber of the Russian Federation. Member of the Parliamentary Assembly of the Council of Europe, the Russian Federation Commission for UNESCO, the Supreme Environmental Council of the State Duma Committee on Natural Resources, Environment and Ecology.

Formation and academic degrees

In 1960 Grachev graduated from the Ivanovo Industrial College, and in 1961 enrolled in the Penza Polytechnic Institute specializing in foundry. In 1966, he graduated with honors.

In 1967, Grachev enrolled in the graduate school of the Moscow Institute of Electronic Machine Building (MIEM). In 1969 he defended his thesis, and in 1987 his doctoral dissertation.

Since 1991, Grachev has been a corresponding member of the Russian Academy of Sciences in the department of physical chemistry and technology of inorganic materials.

In 1996, Grachev received a second degree in law at the Penza State University.

Beginning of professional activity
After graduating with honours from the Ivanovo Industrial College in 1960, Grachev worked for 15 years (until 1974) at the Penza compressor plant where from shop foreman he grew to chief metallurgist of the head laboratory.
Since 1974, Grachev is senior lecturer, associate professor, and since 1980 - Head of the "Machinery and Technology Foundry Department" of the Penza Polytechnic Institute.
He worked as head of the department at the Bauman Moscow State Technical University and the Academy of Labour and Social Relations.

Career

Federal Assembly of Russia

In 1990 Grachev was nominated candidate for People's Deputy of the RSFSR by the staff of the Penza Polytechnic Institute, and elected at the Pervomaisky district No. 568 (Penza Oblast) to the Congress of the Supreme Council.

From 1990 to 1993, Grachev was deputy chairman of the Supreme Council for science and public education. He was member of the faction "Communists for Democracy (from 1991 member of "Free Russia", faction of Alexander Rutskoi supporters). In December 1992, Grachev made a discourse on behalf of the faction of "Free Russia" at the VII Congress. In the Supreme Soviet of the Russian Federation he advocated for expense reduction in defence, space exploration and the maintenance of bureaucracy. He suggested returning the external debt of Russia; expanding the production of consumer goods by converting military production; reallocating capital investments primarily to the agricultural sector.

In 1999, Grachev became chief of staff of the Russian Federation Council Committee on Science, Culture, Education, Health and Environment. December 19, 1999 he was elected to the State Duma of the third convocation from the block "Unity" ("The Bear"). In January 2000, he registered in the parliamentary faction "Unity" in the State Duma.  January 19, 2000 he became head of the Committee on Environment. February 27, 2000 at the founding congress of the All-Russian political public movement "Unity" Grachev is elected member of the Political Council of "Unity." May 27, 2000, at the founding congress of "Unity" he was elected member of the Presidium of the political council of the party.

December 7, 2003 Grachev was elected to the State Duma from the party "United Russia". He became a member of the faction "United Russia". He is then elected Chairman of the Committee on Ecology of the State Duma. As member of the General Council of the Party, Grachev has a wide range of activities in the assigned territories. In 2006 he is appointed coordinator of the Russian political party "United Russia" on environmental issues.

As Chairman of the State Duma Committee on Ecology, Grachev is personally involved in the development of more than 40 bills. He heads working groups for 18 of them, including the following:
 "On board for the negative impact on the environment" (Federal Law of January 10, 2002 N 7-FZ "On Environmental Protection". Article 16. Fee for a negative impact on the environment)
 Federal Law of 26 June 2008 N 96-FZ On Introducing Amendments to the Federal Law "On Ecological Expertise"
 "On the areas of ecological disaster" (Federal Law of January 10, 2002 N 7-FZ "On Environmental Protection". Chapter VIII, Environmental disaster areas, emergencies areas)
 "On soil protection" (Project of the Federal Law N 83224-3 «On soil protection" (ed., introduced into the State Duma))
 "On ecological culture" (Draft Federal Law "On Environmental Culture» No. 90060840-3 (introduced 7/13/2000))
 "On Amending the Federal Law "On Specially Protected Natural Territories""
 "On Amending the Federal Law "On the Hydrometeorological Service""
 "On Amending the Federal Law "On Protection of Lake Baikal ".

Under the leadership of Grachev the Federal Law "On Environmental Protection" has been developed and brought to the adoption. It is the country's "environmental constitution" that enables to efficiently combine environmental protection with environmental management and effective maintenance of all the sectors of economy.

On the initiative of the environmental community and the efforts of Grachev July 23, 2007 Vladimir Putin established by decree a professional holiday - Day of the Ecologist, celebrated June 5.

Postfederal Assembly period
From the beginning of his career, Grachev has been paying much attention to environmental problems of the nuclear industry. Working in the Federal Assembly, he resolves issues related to the development of nuclear energy and nuclear safety at the legislative level. Grachev is author and active promoter of the concept that large-scale introduction of nuclear power will solve global environmental problems. Largely due to his convictions he became an advisor to the Director General, SC "Rosatom" in 2008 after retiring from government.

Social activity

In addition to his main profession, Grachev is chairman of the Public Council of Rostekhnadzor Public Council of the Rostechnadzor, member of the Public Council SC "Rosatom".

Grachev is actively cooperating with the authorities. He is member of the Supreme Environmental Council of the State Duma Committee on Natural Resources, Environment and Ecology; member of the Advisory Board under the Chairman of the Accounts Chamber of the Russian Federation.

Interaction with international organizations, participation in international projects, symposia, conferences, forums - all this is an integral part of Grachev's activity. He is member of the Parliamentary Assembly of the Council of Europe, the Russian Federation Commission for UNESCO.

In 2001, Grachev founded the Ecological Movement of Concrete Deeds. This is a social movement whose goal was protection of the environment and human health, environmental safety and prevention of environmental and technological disasters through concrete actions. On its basis in 2010 the International Environmental Non-Governmental Organization «GREENLIGHT»«GREENLIGHT» was established. Grachev is currently chairman of its executive board.

«GREENLIGHT» is an international public environmental organization created to promote the establishment and development of clean and safe forms of energy production, to actively promote, conserve and restore the natural environment and interested in continual improvements in the areas of environmental protection and health care. The organization focuses on a number of activities, among them: natural resources management; environmental monitoring, providing independent and transparent view of the environmental performance of a wide range of projects; public participation in environmental policy implementation; creation of a favorable ecological environment and human habitat.

Mission statement:
 promote the establishment and development of clean, environment friendly and safe forms of energy production;
 promote cooperation between environmental NGOs and government in environmental policy implementation in accordance with the Ecological Doctrine of Russia and the concept of sustainable development declared by the UN 
 independent environmental monitoring;
 create a database on the state of the environment in Russia and the latest scientific and technical achievements in the fields of environmental protection and management;
 development, adoption and implementation of “Greenlight’s” own environmental programs;
 participate in solving climate change problems by promoting the development and implementation of green technologies and energy-saving high-tech solutions and intensifying efforts in discussions and negotiations held under the United Nations Framework Convention on Climate Change (UNFCCC) and Kyoto Protocol;
 promote an environmental investments system, providing financial and economic aspects of environmental and health protection systems, eliminate consequences of environmental and technological disasters;
 promote the development and implementation of the latest environment friendly technologies and equipment for different industries and agriculture;
 promote the development and improvement of hydrogen energy technologies;
 promote radiation safety;
 promote green processing, transportation and disposal of waste;
 promote the destruction of chemical weapons in an environmentally acceptable manner introducing safe technologies of its utilization;
 participate in groups for preparation of the legislative and other normative-legal acts and international treaties in the field of ecology;
 promote environmental culture, education and ecological thinking, involve volunteers into environmental management;
 promote basic and applied research;
 environmental consulting and analytical reviews

Arthur Chilingarov is Chairman of the Supreme Council of «Greenlight». He is a distinguished Russian scientist and oceanographer, political leader, Hero of the Soviet Union and Hero of the Russian Federation, Doctor of Geography, Corresponding Member of the Russian Academy of Sciences.

The Presidium of the «GREENLIGHT» Supreme Council includes:
 Valery Chereshnev – « GREENLIGHT » board member, chairman of the State Duma Committee on Science and High Technology, Doctor of Medicine, professor, academician of the Russian Academy of Medical Sciences and Academy of Sciences.
 Aleksander Ishkov - doctor of chemical sciences, professor. Author of 100 academic papers and 20 inventions. He participated in many international projects, headed numerous groups to develop draft laws, concepts and programs.
 Gennadiy Onishchenko - Chief State Sanitary Doctor of the Russian Federation, MD, professor, academician of the Academy of Medical Sciences, Honoured Doctor of the Russian Federation.
 Mikhail Zalikhanov - Member of the State Duma Committee for Science and High Technology, Doctor of Geological Sciences, academician of the Russian Academy of Sciences. Author of over 300 academic papers and 32 inventions.
 Boris Myasoedov - academician, doctor of chemical sciences, professor, head of laboratory. Author of over 450 academic papers, including three monographs and more than 25 patents.

Currently “GREENLIGHT" operates in 5 countries - Italy, France, United States, Czech Republic, Kazakhstan and Ukraine. The Ecological International Non-Governmental Organization «GREENLIGHT» is actively growing. New offices are going to open in 11 other countries.

The international environmental organization «GREENLIGHT» includes 32 program committees. They address the most pressing environmental issues of global significance.
The following activities, organized by “GREENLIGHT” are of particular significance:
 National Conference on Environmental Education (October 25, 2009);
 Conference "Development of Environmental Policy Framework of the Russian Federation until 2030" (October 21, 2010);
 Conference "Development and implementation of a comprehensive plan of research of weather and climate" (August 27, 2010);
 The Second National Conference on Environmental Education (November 25, 2011).

Parliamentary Assembly of the Council of Europe
Grachev is a member of the Parliamentary Assembly of the Council of Europe since 2000. He defends the interests of the Russian Federation on issues of ecology, environment, nuclear energy, science, education, agriculture, culture etc. Currently, Grachev continues his work at the PACE as an expert of the Russian Federation delegation. He repeatedly raises the question of adequate assessment of the global ecological role of Russia in the world in his discourses at the PACE:

 "With only 2% of GDP, Russia contributes no less than 10% of the worldwide ecological system: we have 13 million km² of pristine ecosystems, more than 11 million km² of forests, which make 25% of the world's forests. These are the "green lungs" of the planet. About a quarter of all the world's fresh water is in Russia. The global ecological role of Russia should be adequately assessed. Global warming, radioactive waste, nuclear power - these most important issues are directly related to our country. " 
Cooperating with PACE Grachev has repeatedly drawn its attention to the following issues:
 potential threats to the ecosystem of the Baltic Sea in relation to the disposal of chemical weapons of the Second World War at the bottom;
 global climate change caused by carbon dioxide accumulation ;
 radioactive waste and the environment;
 environment protection in the Arctic region.

In 2011 at the April session of the Parliamentary Assembly of the Council of Europe Grachev was officially awarded the diploma of the honorary member of the PACE and the medal Pro Merito (“For merits").

Presenting the award and a diploma, the PACE President Mevlut Cavusoglu pointed out the importance of Grachev's work in the Parliamentary Assembly in 2000-2008:"It’s an honour for the Committee on the Environment and its members to have had as a colleague a person who was chairman of the Committee on the Environment of the State Duma of the Russian Federation and a recognized expert in the field of energy and the Kyoto Protocol."

“Rosatom” State Corporation

Grachev is currently adviser to Head of the State Corporation "Rosatom", and member of the Public Council of State Corporation "Rosatom". He is one of the founders of nuclear power development in Russia and in the world. Grachev has repeatedly raised questions concerning the joint (international) development and use of Nuclear binding energy in order to ensure global energy security.
"The international community needs to effectively address three interrelated challenges - energy security, economic growth and environmental protection. Fair and competitive, market-based responses to global energy challenges will help to prevent possible destructive actions that threaten the production, supply and transit of energy and create a sound basis for dynamic and sustainable development of our civilization in the long term. "

Grachev believes that in the next 30–50 years Nuclear binding energy should make a meaningful contribution to energy security as the basis for sustainable development. At a meeting of the PACE in 2010, he said:"Nuclear power is the most viable, technologically proven, environmentally friendly and competitive alternative to hydrocarbon energy. We believe that developing nuclear power, the world is moving in the right direction. The attractiveness of nuclear energy is determined by its competitive advantages such as the lowest compared to other energy sources dependence on fuel prices growth, small amount of energy transportation, deep study of the issues of nuclear and environmental safety, environmental protection, absence of greenhouse gas emissions and negative impact on the climate. <...> The strategic direction of nuclear power development is the further internationalization of the nuclear fuel cycle in order to ensure reliable access to the countries interested in its products and services, with absolute respect to the international non-proliferation regime. The tasks facing Russia and the world community, are global by nature. So stable, secure, safe nuclear power development is possible only by working together on multilateral and bilateral basis. Russia, as one of the world leading suppliers of uranium products and services is completely open and ready for such cooperation. "

Despite the tragedy that occurred as a result of the accident at the Fukushima Nuclear Power Plant-I Grachev remains committed to his views on the future of the nuclear industry. April 14, 2011 he gave an interview to the newspaper "Moskovsky Komsomolets", as well as to the TV channel RBC. As an expert he answered questions: what happened in the Japanese nuclear power plants; what are the consequences of radiation leakage in Russia and in the world; is there any danger for Russian regions; what impact the accident at the "Fukushima-1" will have on plans for nuclear power.

Grachev, while chairman of the Committee of Environment in the State Duma, paid great attention to issues relating to nuclear and radiation safety of Russia. Through effective collaboration with the State Corporation "Rosatom" in 2006, it became possible to achieve concrete results in addressing the issue of the resettlement of the Muslyumovo settlement residents, as well as to solve problems of Techa cascades of water.

For several years, from 2008 Grachev has been closely involved in the development of environmental policy of the State Corporation "Rosatom". In 2011 a book was published: "The Environmental Policy of the State Corporation "Rosatom". Grachev is among the authors. The book presents the environmental policy of the State Corporation "Rosatom" in accordance with the goals and challenges facing the nuclear industry of Russia, and describes the technical, legal and institutional framework of the implementation of environmental policy of the State Corporation "Rosatom". The book is intended for employees of the nuclear industry, allied industries professionals, educators and students of higher and secondary educational institutions, general public interested in the problems of ecological safety and environmental protection.

Grachev's activities in the field of nuclear security, including cooperation with international organizations are highly appreciated by the leaders of the State Corporation "Rosatom". In 2010 the adviser to the director of "Rosatom" State Corporation, chairman of the board of the ecological international NGO "GREENLIGHT" Grachev, was awarded a medal for outstanding achievements in the nuclear industry.

Federal Service for Environmental, Technological and Nuclear Supervision
Since 2008 Grachev is the head of the Public Council under the Federal Service for Ecological, Technological and Nuclear Supervision (Rostekhnadzor). The Public Council of Rostechnadzor includes scientists, doctors, professors, representatives of public organizations in all the fields of Rostekhnadzor interest. At the first meeting of the Public Council January 14, 2008 Grachev said:
The creation of the Public Council is an important event in terms of considering public opinion in the Federal Service for Ecological, Technological and Nuclear Supervision. To implement the 24 types of supervision, which the Service provides, it is important to keep in touch with the public. Control is a conflict between producers and controllers. From this perspective public opinion is very important. The combination of the views of citizens, community organizations and academia provides a one comprehensive view. Then it becomes a sophisticated and objective opinion. This will allow Rostechnadzor and the public to receive information not in a distorted form, which sometimes happens. It is very important to form an opinion not based on the statements of offended rule violators, but on the real state of affairs. The reflection of the objective image is perhaps the most important thing in the work of the Public Council"

July 2011 the Coordinating Committee of public councils in the federal government prepared a summary rating of the effectiveness of public councils in the federal government for the 1st half of 2011. The Public Council of the Federal Service for Ecological, Technological and Nuclear Supervision has taken the first place.

Awards

 Order of Honour (Russian Federation);
 Order For Merit to the Fatherland IV class;
 Medal of the Order "For Merit to the Fatherland" II class;
 Medal "For chemical disarmament";
 Medal "For the protection of the environment";
 Order of National Glory;
 Highest award of Kuzbass "Key of Friendship";
 Jubilee Awards of St. Petersburg and Yakutia;
 Governmental Prize of 2006 in the field of science and technology for developing and implementing a system of environmental monitoring as a component of strategic security;
 Double award of the title "Inventor of the USSR" and the honorary title of Rospatent for achievements in innovation.

Scientific and expert activity
The main areas of research are: thermodynamics, kinetics and mechanism of interaction between the phases of metals and alloys melting. research works in thermodynamics and kinetics of melting of cast alloys, environment and resource-saving in this process.

While working at the plant (1960-1974) Grachev, alongside the main work, carries out research on the rational use of natural gas fuel in industry. As a result of his inventions and innovations all heating and drying ovens with liquid and solid fuels were transferred to natural gas, bringing the plant considerable economic effect and significantly reducing the adverse impact on the foundry environment.

Grachev continued the research work initiated at the plant, in the Penza Polytechnic Institute. This resulted in the theoretical justification of the implementation of the cupola process with natural gas instead of coke. Economic and environmental benefits of widespread use of the developed method were proven.

Grachev made a great contribution to the theory of melting processes of casting alloys: he carried out a systematic analysis of these processes, developed a theory of interaction between the phases, taking into account the effect of temperature fluctuations, which greatly enriched the theoretical basis of melting thermodynamics, mechanics and kinetics of melting. His work has found recognition in our country and abroad. In recent years, under the leadership of Grachev a fundamentally new design of furnaces for melting aluminum alloys has been established, a number of problems in the field of environmental engineering practice has been solved.
Grachev is the author of 242 inventions protected by copyright certificates of the USSR, by patents of Russia and other countries. A number of them can be seen below:
 V.Grachev., A.Cherni and others. «Gas cupola», А. С. No. 167613, 10.04.65, B No. 2, 1965;
 V.Grachev., A.Cherni and others. «Method of smelting iron in a gas cupola», А. С. No. 257699,  6.07.66г., B No. 36, 1969. USA Patent No. 3558791, 7.05.71;
 V.Grachev and others. «Electroslag furnace for casting iron», А. С. No. 521745, 30.11.75;
 V.Grachev, V.Poruchikov, V.Miliaev and others. «Method of centrifugal casting », А. С.USSR No. 776743;
 V.Grachev, V.Morgunov and others. «Shaft furnace for melting aluminum alloys», А. С. USSR No. 972202, B.I. No. 41, 1982;
 V.Grachev, E.Kirin, N.Gorelov.  «Method of managing smelting iron in a gas cupola with refractory nozzle and air heaters», А. С. USSR No. 1067902;
 A.Cherni, V.Grachev and others. «Gas multinozzle burner», А. С. No. 256930, 10.11.66, B No. 35, 1969;
 A.Cherni, V.Grachev and others. «Method of melting metal in a gas cupola», А. С. No. 269947, 18.11.66, B No. 16, 1970. Patents: USA No. 3753688, 5.11.73, Belgium No. 702319, 15.05.68, Netherlands No. 150223, 16.05.77, Japan No. 844668, 18.07.72, GFR No. 1583279, 24.08.70, Sweden No. 339534, 24.04.72, France No. 1561093, 8.02.71, England No. 1206976, 1.03.71, Italy No. 863027, 5.10.70;
 A.Cherni, V.Grachev and others. «Unit for the continuous production of steel», А. С. No. 251775, 22.05.67, B No. 28, 1969;
 A.Cherni, V.Grachev and others. «Gas burner», А. С. No. 293488, 3.04.70. Patent: Japan No. 834475, 7.02.77, France No. 7105537, 12.03.73, GFR No. 2106074, 4.02.77, England No. 1308160, 5.10.74, DRG No. 94448,  26.03.73, Italy No. 919843, 5.03.73, Belgium No. 763848, 27.11.71;
 V.Grachev, V.Gorelov, A. Semushkin. «Mine for melting synthetic slag», А. С. USSR No. 1502626, BI No. 31, 1989;
 V.Grachev and others. «Mine-reverberatory furnace for melting aluminum and its alloys», А. С. No. 1719838, 15.11.91, B No. 10, 15.03.92;
 V.Grachev and others. «Injection in-mold inoculation bowl melt». Patent RF No. 2007267, B No. 3, 15.02.94;
 U.Kudriavsky, V.Grachev, M.Zilberman and others. «Hardware and processing facility for disposal of highly toxic halogenated organic compounds». Patent RF No. 45853, B. No. 15, 27.05.2005.

Bibliography
The result of Grachev's academic research can be seen in more than 615 published works, 26 monographs, 7 textbooks for high schools, 15 manuals. He was the academic supervisor of more than 10 dissertations for candidate's and doctor's degree.

 On metallurgy:
 Casting alloys and their melting technology in mechanical engineering: Textbook for engineering schools, specialty "Machines and foundry technology".  V.Vozdvyzhensky, V.Grachev, V. Spassky. - Moscow: Mashinostroenie, 1984. - 432 p.
 N.Girshovich. Handbook in iron casting, 3rd ed., revised L: Mechanical Engineering. Leningrad. Branch, 1978. -758 p.
 V. Grachev. "Physical, chemical and electrochemical characteristics of phase interaction in secondary smelting of iron". Textbook, Penza, Penza Polytechnic Institute, 1979, 96p.
 V.Grachev. " Physical and chemical basis of melting iron".  Saratov State University, 1981, 208 p.
 V. Grachev, S. Kazantsev and others. “Furnaces in the foundry industry. Atlas of designs". Textbook for university students, specialty  "Casting of ferrous and nonferrous metals" and "Machinery and Technology foundry". M. Mechanical Engineering, 1989. - 156 p.
 V. Grachev. "Oven foundries". Textbook for high schools. M. MSU 1994, 633 p.
 V. Grachev, V. Spassky and others. "Casting alloys and their melting technology in mechanical engineering". Textbook for engineering schools. M., Mechanical Engineering, 1990.
 On Ecology and Environment:
 V. Grachev, N. Aghajanian and others. "Human Ecology in a Changing World". 2nd Edition, Ekaterinburg: Ural Branch of the Academy of Sciences, 2008. .
 V. Grachev and others. "Ecology". "March", Moscow-Rostov-on-Don, 2006, 768 p.
 V. Grachev and others. "Ecology. Military ecology". Textbook for high schools, “Kamerton” 2006, 855 p.
 V.Denisov, V.Gutenev, I.Denisova, V.Grachev and others.  “Life Safety”.  "March", Textbook, Moscow - Rostov-on-Don, 2007.
 V.Gutenev, L.Denisov, A.Kamishev, V. Grachev and others. “Aerospace Sensing in the system of interaction of environmental safety and facilities”. Monograph, Moscow, 2006
 V.Azarov, A. Azhgirevich, V.Bondarenko, V. Grachev and others. “Industrial Ecology”. "March", Textbook, Moscow, 2007
 A.Azhgirevich, V. Gutenev, V.Denisov, V.Grachev and others. “Organization of environmental safety of military activity”. Textbook, Moscow, 2007
 V. Denisov, A. Kurbatov, I.Denisova, V.Grachev and others. “City ecology”.  "March", Textbook. Moscow - Rostov-on-Don, 2008
 G. Onishchenko, U.Rakhmanin, F. Karmazinov, V.Grachev, E.Nefedova. “Benchmarking of drinking water quality”. Monograph, 2010
 A.Agapov, V.Grachev and others. “Environmental policy of the State Corporation "Rosatom" / A23, edited by V. Grachev: Center for promotion of social and environmental initiatives in the nuclear industry. 2011.- 350p. .

Character and personal qualities

The main features of Grachev, scientist and politician are passion for knowledge, continuous learning, huge inexhaustible creative activity, systematic academic work. He has always been studying and is in constant academic search, seeking and finding new technical solutions, inventing. He is actively engaged in the implementation of inventions, writing books, working on many environmental problems. In 2002 he published "Theory and practice of personal success," the work that reveals the basic principles of success in both work and personal life. He gives tips of how to develop qualities of a scientist, engineer, manager, student:

How can we teach young professionals, and anyone who wants to succeed, to think creatively? How can we develop thirst for success, a feeling of success? What determines the quality and productivity of creative thinking and how can they improve, how is it possible to achieve success on this basis of solution of specific scientific, technical, economic, legal problems? The answer to these questions is the objective of the book.

References

External links
 (Russian) Russian nuclear community: V.Grachev
 (Russian) International environmental non-governmental organization «GREENLIGHT»
 (Russian) Vladimir Grachev, "Environment Day is celebrated in Russia with the rest of the planet"
 (Russian) Public Council of the State Corporation "Rosatom"
 (Russian) Interview of the editor of "Ecology and Law" magazine with the chairman of the State Duma Committee on Ecology  Vladimir  Grachev (2006)

Russian metallurgists
20th-century scientists
1942 births
Corresponding Members of the Russian Academy of Sciences
Russian ecologists
Rosatom
Living people
Russian physical chemists
Recipients of the Order of Honour (Russia)
Recipients of the Medal of the Order "For Merit to the Fatherland" II class
Third convocation members of the State Duma (Russian Federation)
Fourth convocation members of the State Duma (Russian Federation)